"The Legend of the Twin Dragons of the Great Tang Dynasty" is a Wuxia novel written by Huang Yi based on the background of the end of the Sui Dynasty and the beginning of the Tang Dynasty, which integrates history, military, and fantasy. The full set of books totals more than 5 million words. It has been adapted into TV dramas, comics, and games etc.

Plot summary

The story tells about the Sui Dynasty, Emperor Yang's desire for insatiable desire, two small gangsters without eating three meals a day, with his natural resources and chances, changed the fate of martial arts and even the world.

Kou Zhong and Xu Ziling are two gangsters in Jiangdu, Yangzhou who have not eaten three meals a day . They were chased and killed by Yuwen Huaji because they accidentally picked up the Taoist martial arts classic " Longevity Jue ". They survived under the shelter of "Raksha Girl" Fu Jun. Later, in order to protect Kou Zhong and Xu Ziling, Fu Junxu fought against Yuwen Huaji and died. Before his death, he revealed the key clues of Ssangyong's "Yanggong Treasure"; they both determined to learn martial arts well and swear. Ren Yu culture and revenge for Fu Jun's son and hate, and then break away from the career of a small gangster. Started to study "Longevity Jue" and learned the secrets of Yang Gong's treasure, but because of this, he was coveted and threatened by others.

Kou Xu and the two first wandered the rivers and lakes, and their daily martial arts progressed. Then they met Houhou, the first disciple of the Yingui School of the Demon Men, and discovered that the "Longevity Jue" was on Ssangyong. They joined the chase and killed them all. Kou Zhong and Xu Ziling not only survived many disasters, but also greatly increased their martial arts by virtue of the internal strength of the "Longevity Jue" and some comprehensible martial arts moves. During the adventure, Ssangyong had to meet Li Shimin, the second son of the Li Clan. The two people admired Li Shimin's magnanimity and ambition to dominate the world. They wanted to submit, but Ssangyong came from a humble background and was not treated equally by everyone. In addition, Kou Zhong was heartbroken for Li Xiuning's inconspicuousness, and Kou Zhong was determined to devote himself to fighting for the world's hegemony. Ranks. But it also changed the personality of the two. Kou Zhong is very active and a natural adventurer, so he pursued the great aspirations of Lu Zhongyuan; Xu Ziling is so quiet, although he is in the world, there is an elegant wind.

Ssangyong fought the world, saw the suffering people, and became more determined to save the country and the people. After stealing "He's Bi" to expand and transform the meridians, he gradually refined his martial arts attainments through the method of "raising battles by fighting", and gradually controlled the resources available in the surrounding area, in order to compete with the surrounding nobles. In such a struggle situation After getting acquainted with Ba Fenghan and the "passionate son" Hou Xibai, the two sides gradually established a friendship of mutual adversity from a hostile situation; on the other hand, although Ssangyong was born in the lower class, he has a faithful style and extraordinary charm. Gradually won the attachment of some people.

Although the two of them have different personalities, they have a deep friendship. They have worked side by side to resolve crises many times. They also created a young marshal army and raised the treasures of Yang Gong. They were able to develop the foundation of contending for the world in Pengliang. Kou Zhong leads the Marshal Army, and he meets Shang Xiufang, the world's number one talented woman, while Xu Ziling explores the ultimate martial arts, and meets Shi Qingxuan, the master of Xiao Yi .

Later, the two went far beyond the Great Wall to practice together with Ba Fenghan and benefited a lot. Both martial arts have made great strides. After returning to Turkey, and the army began to rival Li Shimin rivalry, and finally by Chi Hong Ching Shi Feixuan lobby, in the case of righteous, Kouzhong eventually put down the idea of becoming emperor. Assist Qin King Li Shimin, help him initiate the change of Xuanwumen and ascend to the throne, and immediately retreat to the rivers and lakes and Xiaoao Mountain.

Characters
There are many characters in "The Legend of Double Dragon of Tang Dynasty", and there are at least 748 people. There are many different tribes, in setting the nation on Han Chinese, barbarian, Sichuan minority, south Vulgar Liao, Korea, Turks, prairie ethnic groups and so on.

 Kou Zhong study the Changsheng Jue, and become martial artists themselves.

 Tzui Zhi Ling two gangsters in Jiangdu.

 Lee Sau Ling

 Wan Wan

 Shek Ching Shuen

 Szee Fei Hyun

 Sung Yuk Chi

Published version 
 1996-2000: Hong Kong, Huang Yi Publishing House, first edition, 63 volumes.
 1996-2000: Taiwan, published by Vientiane, first edition, volume 1-59. In 2000, due to the arrears of manuscript fees by Vientiane Publishing House, 60 to 63 volumes were directly distributed from Hong Kong to Taiwan for sale.
 2002: Taiwan, published by The Times, reprinted and revised edition, 20 volumes.
 2004: Hong Kong, Huang Yi Publishing House, Revised Collector's Edition, 20 volumes.
 2019: Taiwan, Gaia Culture, Collector's Edition, 21 volumes.

Writing method

The plot features are similar to role-playing games, which can be divided into two aspects, one is the switching of the screen and the change of the narrative angle, and the other is the event triggered by the event, which is interlocking. Main line. The former is also about expressive techniques. When writing text, it is very focused on the creation of a sense of the picture. The text is used to shape the overall space, color, temperature, sound, role movements, etc., a very clear description is given, and left to Readers have less white space in their imagination and describe a lot of details more directly.

In the two-line narration, one paragraph of Xu Ziling's story and one paragraph of Kou Zhongshi's practice are adopted. If one of the people is skipped and connected, it is a very smooth and complete narrative, but the author deliberately intersperses the two people's parts. The writing seems to split the integrity of the text, but it has the advantage of allowing events to happen at the same time, making the events more authentic and credible. Even at the same time, the messages of Ssangyong in different scenes far away are transmitted to make the omniscient. Readers can fully see the connection of events.

Follow-up works
Since November 2012, Huang Yi has published a monthly volume of "The Sun and the Moon in the Sky ". After the little girl Ming Kong ( Wu Zhao ) who appeared at the end of The Legend of Twin Dragons of the Great Tang Dynasty became the empress, he collected the "Devil Strategy of Heaven". "The Dafa of Dao Heart Seeds Demon" is the beginning of the story.

"The Sun Moon in the Sky" was released in April 2014 to Volume 18, and was continued in May 2014 with "The Dragon Fight in the Wild ". " Dragon Fighting in the Wild" was released in October 2015 to Volume 18, and was continued with "The Bright Ring of Heaven and Earth" in November 2015 but the author could not finish the novel due to his demise.

Adapted works

Comic
Comic -by Huang Yulang and Qiu Fulong . The story tells that in the last years of the Sui Dynasty, Emperor Yang wanted to fulfill his insatiable desires. He had two small gangsters who did not continue to eat three meals a day. With his natural resources and luck, he changed the fate of martial arts and even the world. Kou Zhong and Xu Ziling are two little gangsters in Jiangdu, Yangzhou who have not eaten three meals a day. They were hunted down and killed by Yuwen Huaji after they accidentally picked up the Taoist martial arts classic "Longevity Jue". Secret Art, and learned the secret of Yang Gong's treasure, but because of this, he was coveted and threatened by others.

TV series

In the TV series produced by Hong Kong TVB in 2004, some plots are different from the novel version. There is a big gap between TV and the original.

2011 Chinese mainland ancient costume martial arts TV series.

Game
Twin of Brothers - by the power of science and technology production, Soft-World International issued a stand-alone game. Issued in July 2001.
Huang Yi Qun Xia Chuan Online -an online game based on Huang Yi's novels.

References

External links
Figure of the separatist rule of the late Sui and early Tang Dynasty-Times Yue Read Network

Novels by Huang Yi